The Southern California Pro-Wrestling Hall of Fame was created in 2001 by wrestlers Cincinnati Red, Jason "Primetime" Peterson and Steven Bryant, it was dedicated in the memory of Louie Spicolli. The Hall of Fame was created with the mission to preserve and promote the history of professional wrestling in Southern California. It is currently hosted on the SoCal Uncensored website.

History
The 2010 induction ceremony took place at Mach 1 Wrestling's Hall of Fame Cup. Disco Machine and TARO accepted the award for Super Dragon who could not be there, and Joey Munoz accepted the award for Dynamite D who died in 2007. Voting for the 2016 inductions took place in February 2016. The 2017 induction ceremony took place on September 22, 2017 at a Santino Bros. Wrestling Academy event in Downey, CA. The 2020 inductions were announced on April 10, 2020 but no induction ceremony was held due to the COVID-19 pandemic.

Inductees

2001
 Freddie Blassie
 Chavo Guerrero Sr.
 Roddy Piper
 Louie Spicoli
2002
 “The Destroyer” Dick Beyer
 Johnny “Red Shoes” Duggan
 Gorgeous George
 Dick Lane
 Ed “Strangler” Lewis
 Mil Mascaras
2003
 Mando Guerrero
 Gene LeBell
 Lou Thesz
 John Tolos
2004
 Great Goliath
 Mike LeBell
 Jimmy Lennon Sr.
 Baron Michele Leone
 Jim Londos
 Ray Mendoza
2005
 Black Gordman
 Hijo del Santo
 Lou Daro
2006
 Jesse Hernandez
 Doink the Clown
2007
 Bill Anderson
 Buff Bagwell
2010
 Darren “Dynamite D” McMillan
 Super Dragon
 Enrique Torres
2016
 Bobo Brazil
 Cincinnati Red
 Sandor Szabo
2017
 Joey "Kaos" Munoz
 Man Mountain Dean
 Superboy
 Charlie Haas
2020
 Christopher Daniels
 Ernie Ladd
 Jeff Walton
 Jon Ian
 Rick Knox

References

External links 
 

2001 establishments in the United States
Awards established in 2001
Professional wrestling halls of fame
Sports hall of fame inductees
Halls of fame in California